Jorge Eduardo Lozano (born 10 February 1955) is a prelate of the Roman Catholic Church. He served as auxiliary bishop of Buenos Aires from 2000 until 2005, when he became bishop of Gualeguaychú. He became coadjutor archbishop of San Juan de Cuyo in 2016 and succeeded to that see in 2017.

Life 
Born in Buenos Aires on 10 February 1955, Lozano was ordained to the priesthood by Cardinal Juan Carlos Aramburu, Archbishop of Buenos Aires, on 3 December 1982.

On 4 January 2000, Pope John Paul II appointed him auxiliary bishop of Buenos Aires and titular bishop of Furnos Maior.

He received his episcopal consecration on 25 March from Jorge Mario Bergoglio, archbishop of Buenos Aires, with the bishop of San Martín, Raúl Omar Rossi, and auxiliary bishop of Buenos Aires, Mario José Serra, serving as co-consecrators.

Pope Benedict XVI appointed him bishop of Gualeguaychú on 22 December 2005, and he was installed on 11 March 2006.

Pope Francis named him coadjutor archbishop for the Archdiocese of San Juan de Cuyo on 31 August 2016, and he became its archbishop on 17 June 2017.

On 6 November 2020 he was named secretary general of the Episcopal Conference of Latin America (CELAM).

References

External links 

 

1955 births
21st-century Roman Catholic bishops in Argentina
Living people
Clergy from Buenos Aires
Roman Catholic bishops of Gualeguaychú
Roman Catholic archbishops of San Juan de Cuyo